Hugo Félix Sequeira (born 3 March 2004) is a Portuguese professional footballer who plays as a midfielder for Benfica.

Early life
Born in Viseu, Félix spent his early career with Porto, before joining Benfica satellite club Casa do Benfica Viseu in 2015.

Club career
Having linked up with Benfica's youth sides permanently in 2016, Félix signed his first professional contract in July 2020.

After stellar performances in the youth ranks of Benfica, Félix is seen as one of the Lisbon-based club's best young players, and has been tipped to become a world-class footballer. He was included in The Guardian's "Next Generation" list for 2021, highlighting the best young players in the world.

International career
Félix has represented Portugal at youth international level.

Personal life
He is the brother of fellow professional footballer João Félix, who is currently on loan from Atletico Madrid at Premier League club Chelsea.

Career statistics

Club

Honours
Benfica
 UEFA Youth League: 2021–22
Portugal
CONCACAF Under-15 Championship: 2019
Nations Cup: 2019

References

External links
 

2004 births
Living people
People from Viseu
Sportspeople from Viseu District
Portuguese footballers
Portugal youth international footballers
Association football midfielders
Liga Portugal 2 players
FC Porto players
S.L. Benfica B players